Nelson Oñate (7 March 1943 – 11 September 2022) was a Cuban sports shooter. He competed in the 50 metre pistol event at the 1968 Summer Olympics.

References

External links

1943 births
2022 deaths
Cuban male sport shooters
Olympic shooters of Cuba
Shooters at the 1968 Summer Olympics
Sportspeople from Havana
Pan American Games medalists in shooting
Pan American Games silver medalists for Cuba
Pan American Games bronze medalists for Cuba
Shooters at the 1967 Pan American Games
20th-century Cuban people